is a Japaneseprofessional baseball infielder who is currently a free agent. . He has played in Nippon Professional Baseball (NPB) for the Yokohama DeNA BayStars and Orix Buffaloes.

Career
Yokohama DeNA BayStars selected Shirasaki with the first selection in the 2012 draft.

On May 1, 2013, Shirasaki made his NPB debut.

On December 2, 2020, he become a free agent.

References

External links

 NPB.com

1990 births
Living people
Baseball people from Hokkaido
Japanese baseball players
Komazawa University alumni
Nippon Professional Baseball infielders
Orix Buffaloes players
People from Iwamizawa, Hokkaido
Yokohama DeNA BayStars players